A royal consort is a spouse of a monarch. The Kingdom of Hawaii was founded by Kamehameha I (known as Kamehameha the Great) in 1795 after conquering the major islands in the Hawaiian archipelago. His dynasty lasted until Liliuokalani was deposed by a pro-United States revolution in 1893. Kamehameha I had numerous wives, perhaps over 21, but Kaahumanu was his most favorite wife.

List of royal consorts
Notable wives of Kamehameha I not mentioned on this list are Queen Keōpūolani, his highest ranking wife; Queen Kalakua Kaheiheimālie, sister of Kaahumanu, and many others. His son Kamehameha II had five wives: Queen Kamāmalu, Queen Kekāuluohi, Queen Pauahi, Queen Kīnau, and Queen Kekauōnohi. Kamehameha III was the first King of Hawaii to not practice polygamy. Queen Emma Naea was the first and only hapa haole (part native Hawaiian) queen consort. John Owen Dominis, a full blood American, was Hawaii's only prince consort by the virtue of his marriage to Liliuokalani. Every consort except Dominis outlived their spouse and many were close relatives (from siblings to distant cousins), except Kalama and Dominis.

Kamehameha Dynasty

Kalākaua Dynasty

See also

 List of people from Hawaii

 
Consorts
Hawaiian
Hawaii, List of royal consorts of